WVGC (1400 AM) is a radio station licensed to Elberton, Georgia, United States. The station is currently owned by Georgia-Carolina Radiocasting Company, LLC.

History
The station went on the air in 1946 as WSGC. On August 10, 2007, the station changed its call sign to WNGA; on August 24, 2007, to WSGC; on May 18, 2015, to WMJE; on July 13, 2015, to WSGC; on January 1, 2017, to WHTD; on February 1, 2022, to WGCV; on February 21, 2022, to WATG; and on September 19, 2022, to WVGC.

Previous logo

References

External links

VGC (AM)
Urban adult contemporary radio stations in the United States
Radio stations established in 1947
1947 establishments in Georgia (U.S. state)